Desert Hills High School may refer to one of these two schools:

Desert Hills High School (Utah) in St. George, Utah
Desert Hills High School (Arizona) in Gilbert, Arizona